Moataz Al-Mehdi (born 9 August 1990), is a Libyan footballer who plays for Libyan Premier League side Al-Ahli Tripoli and the Libyan national team as a forward.

Club career
Al-Mehdi scored 7 goals for Al-Nasr Benghazi in its 2018–19 CAF Champions League campaign and finished as the competition's top goalscorer despite his side failing to reach the group stage.

International career

International goals
Scores and results list Libya's goal tally first.

References

External links

1990 births
Living people
Libyan footballers
Libya international footballers
Association football forwards
Kuwait Premier League players
Libyan expatriate footballers
Libyan expatriate sportspeople in Kuwait
Expatriate footballers in Kuwait
Libyan expatriate sportspeople in Oman
2022 African Nations Championship players
Expatriate footballers in Oman
Al-Ahly SC (Benghazi) players
Al-Fahaheel FC players
Al-Nasr SC (Benghazi) players
Al-Ahli SC (Tripoli) players
Salalah SC players
Libyan Premier League players
Libya A' international footballers
2014 African Nations Championship players
2020 African Nations Championship players